Christopher Flanagan is an Irish sportsperson.  He plays hurling with the Westmeath senior inter-county hurling team. On 22 May 2011, he made his championship debut against Carlow in the 2011 All-Ireland Senior Hurling Championship, starting at right corner back in a 4-10 to 1-14 win.

References

Living people
Westmeath inter-county hurlers
Year of birth missing (living people)